Thomas Andrew Bailey (December 14, 1902 – July 26, 1983) was a professor of history at his alma mater, Stanford University, and wrote many historical monographs on diplomatic history, including the widely used American history textbook, The American Pageant. He was known for his witty style and clever terms he coined, such as "international gangsterism." He popularized diplomatic history with his entertaining textbooks and lectures, the presentation style of which followed Ephraim Douglass Adams. Bailey contended foreign policy was significantly affected by public opinion, and that current policymakers could learn from history.

Career
Bailey received his B.A. (1924), M.A. (1925), and Ph.D (1927) from Stanford University, where he was also elected to Phi Beta Kappa. His doctoral work was in U.S. political history. He switched his emphasis towards diplomatic history while teaching at the University of Hawaii.  After three years at Hawaii, he taught American history for nearly 40 years at Stanford and also served as a visiting professor at Harvard, Cornell, the University of Washington, and the National War College in Washington, D.C.  He retired in 1968.

Bailey authored a number of articles in the 1930s that indicated the historical techniques he would use throughout his career. While not groundbreaking, they remain noteworthy for the care with which Bailey systematically overturned received myths about U.S. diplomatic history by a careful reexamination of the underlying sources.  His first book was a study of the diplomatic crisis over racial issues between the United States and Japan during the Theodore Roosevelt administration. He delivered the Albert Shaw Lectures on Diplomatic History at Johns Hopkins on the Wilson administration's policy towards neutrals in 1917-1918, later published in 1942.  While the impact of public opinion on the making of foreign policy was a theme that ran through most of his works, he laid it out most clearly in The Man in the Street, published in 1948.

Perhaps the harshest attack on Wilson's diplomacy came from Bailey in two books that remain widely cited by scholars, Woodrow Wilson and the Lost Peace (1944) and Woodrow Wilson and the Great Betrayal (1945), Bailey:
contended that Wilson's wartime isolationism, as well as his peace proposals at war's end, were seriously flawed. Highlighting the fact that American delegates encountered staunch opposition to Wilson's proposed League of Nations, Bailey concluded that the president and his diplomatic staff essentially sold out, compromising important American ideals to secure mere fragments of Wilson's progressive vision. Hence, while Bailey primarily targeted President Wilson in these critiques, others, including House, did not emerge unscathed.

He trained more than 20 doctoral students in his career.  One of Bailey's students from the 1940s, Betty Miller Unterberger, was elected president of the SHAFR in 1986, the first woman in the position at a time when the organization was 99 percent male. It was Bailey who introduced Unterberger to the subject of one of her prime interests, the Russian Civil War between 1918 and 1920.

He was married to Sylvia Dean, daughter of a former University of Hawaii president.

Honors and awards
In 1960 he served as president of the Pacific Coast Branch of the American Historical Association. In 1968, he was elected to the presidencies of both the Organization of American Historians and the Society for Historians of American Foreign Relations. The Commonwealth Club awarded him gold medals in 1940 for his Diplomatic History of the American People and 1944 for his Woodrow Wilson and the Lost Peace.

Bibliography
 Theodore Roosevelt and the Japanese-American Crisis: An Account of the International Complications Arising from the Race Problems on the Pacific Coast (Stanford: Stanford University Press, 1934).
 The American Pageant (1956) (16 editions by 2015)
 "The Sinking of the Lusitania." The American Historical Review,  Vol. 41, No. 1 (Oct., 1935), pp. 54–73 in JSTOR
 A Diplomatic History of the American People (1940, and reprinted through 10th edition in 1980)
 The Policy of the United States Toward the Neutrals, 1917–1918 (Johns Hopkins University Press, 1942)
 The Man in the Street: The Impact of American Public Opinion on Foreign Policy (New York, 1948)
 Woodrow Wilson and the Lost Peace (New York, 1944)
 Woodrow Wilson and the Great Betrayal (New York, 1945)
 Wilson and the Peacemakers (New York, 1947) [This single volume combined the two earlier Wilson volumes into one]
 America Faces Russia: Russian-American Relations from Early Times to Our Day (Ithaca, NY: Cornell University Press, 1950)
 The Lusitania Disaster (1975) co-authored with Captain Paul B. Ryan
 The American Pageant Revisited (1982) the autobiography of Thomas A. Bailey
 Presidential Greatness (1966)
 The Pugnacious Presidents (1980)
 " PRESIDENTIAL SAINTS AND SINNERS" (1981)

References

Further reading
 Stanford Alumni article UNFORGETTABLE TEACHER: THOMAS A. BAILEY
 O'Connor, Raymond G., "Thomas A. Bailey: His Impact," Diplomatic History 1985 9(4): 303-309.
 Langley, Lester D., "The Diplomatic Historians: Bailey and Bemis," The History Teacher, Vol. 6, No. 1 (November 1972): 51-70.
 DeConde, Alexander, "Thomas A. Bailey: Teacher, Scholar, Popularizer," Pacific Historical Review, Vol. 56, No. 2 (May 1987): 161-193.
 DeConde, Alexander and Armin Rappaport, eds., Essays Diplomatic and Undiplomatic of Thomas A. Bailey (New York, 1969).  This is the festschrift.
 Дорофеев, Д. В. "Генезис внешней политики США: подход общественного мнения Т. Э. Бейли," "Современная наука: актуальные проблемы теории и практики. Серия: Гуманитарные науки", №5 (2021): 6-11.

External links
 Thomas Andrew Bailey: An Oral History, Stanford Historical Society Oral History Program, 1978.

American textbook writers
Cold War historians
Stanford University School of Humanities and Sciences alumni
Historians of the United States
Writers from San Jose, California
Stanford University Department of History faculty
Harvard University staff
1902 births
1983 deaths
People from Menlo Park, California
Historians of American foreign relations
20th-century American historians
American male non-fiction writers
20th-century American male writers